The Sonalba Coal Mine is a coal mine located in Sindh. The mine has coal reserves amounting to 2.47 billion tonnes of coking coal, one of the largest coal reserves in Asia and the world.

See also 
List of mines in Pakistan

References 

Coal mines in Pakistan
Mines in Pakistan